Law Dictionary may refer to:

Any law dictionary, notably:

 Black's Law Dictionary
 Bouvier's Law Dictionary